Stuart Christopher Meaker (born 21 January 1989) is a former cricketer who played for Surrey and Sussex. His family came to England from South Africa in 2001, and he was educated at Cranleigh School. For cricketing purposes he is regarded as English. He is categorised by CricketArchive and Cricinfo as a right-arm fast medium bowler and a right-handed batsman. Surrey's coach Ian Salisbury said of him: "He's always been able to bowl quick and he is a 90mph bowler, but he can also swing the ball, conventionally or reverse later on."

He played in two "Test" matches for the English U-19 cricket team in 2007. He also played in six Under-19 limited overs internationals, of which the last two were in the Under-19 World Cup in Malaysia in 2007–8.

He made his first-class debut for Surrey against Loughborough UCCE in a match that began on 12 April 2008. He did not bat, but took one wicket for 53 runs. He made his List A debut for Surrey against Sussex on 28 May 2008, but did not bat or bowl.

The end of 2008 saw him off to Australia where he played for a club side in Sydney, before returning to play with Surrey. His 2009 season at Surrey saw him significantly improve both his batting and bowling figures.

In September 2011, he was called into England's squad for a one-day series in India later in the year. He had taken only 19 List A wickets at the time of his selection. He made his England One Day International debut on the tour, taking a wicket in the process.

In early November 2012 he was added to the England squad touring India, as cover for the injured Steven Finn. In December he was selected for his first Twenty20 International.

In January 2020, Surrey confirmed that they had released Meaker from his contract, and that he was to join Sussex on a two-year deal.

References

External links
 

1989 births
Living people
Auckland cricketers
Cricketers from Durban
England One Day International cricketers
England Twenty20 International cricketers
English cricketers of the 21st century
English cricketers
English people of South African descent
People educated at Cranleigh School
Surrey cricketers
Sussex cricketers